Randazzo's Clam Bar is an Italian restaurant, opened in 1932, in Sheepshead Bay, Brooklyn. It was destroyed by Hurricane Katrina but was able to reopen. 

The restaurant appeared on Man v. Food (season 9) where host Casey Webb had the linguine with white clam sauce. Randazzo's was one of Anthony Bourdain's five favorite under-the-radar NYC restaurants. He is favorite dish is the lobster fra diavolo and je also enjoyed the chicken parmigiana and broiled salmon. He said "portions that could have once fed an entire block on the Lower East Side."

In January 2019, two people died during a random hammer attack at the restaurant.

History
The Randazzo family owned a seafood shop and bar across from the dock used by the fishermen for their day boats. When the boats came in, as a snack they would give out fried squid (squid was more bait than delicacy then) served in Helen Randazzo's famous Sauce.. Each year, they would add more tables to the bar area. In 1964, the bar became a clam bar and eventuality a formal dining room was added. That closed in 1994. But the clam bar still exists. Helen's grandson Paul now owns the business.

References

External links
 The late Helen Randazzo's famed and busy waterfront seafood mecca maintains its crowds.
 The Art of Opening a Clam

Italian restaurants in New York City
Restaurants in Brooklyn
Sheepshead Bay, Brooklyn
Clam bars